St. Lazare is an unincorporated community recognised as a local urban district in the Rural Municipality of Ellice – Archie within the Canadian province of Manitoba that held village status prior to January 1, 2015.

The site of Saint-Lazare sits 4 kilometres north of the historical site of Fort Ellice, a Hudson's Bay Company trading post and later North-West Mounted Police headquarters. The local community is heavily influenced by this history of confluent French, English, Indian, and Métis cultures.

St. Lazare sits on the valley floor at the confluence of the Assiniboine and Qu'Appelle Rivers. It is on the east bank of the Assiniboine, and because of its position in the valley between the rivers, it is susceptible to flooding. The last major flood was in 2011. During that flood, access to most of the village was cut off. After the flood, the dykes around the village were raised to three feet above the 2011 high water mark to guard against future flooding.

Demographics 

Media 
CKSB-2 860 AM first went on the air as a rebroadcast transmitter on March 12, 1969.

See also
List of villages in Manitoba
List of communities in Manitoba

External links 
 Map of St-Lazare at Statcan
   Archived version of Village of Ste. Lazare website.

References 

Saint Lazare
Saint Lazare
Saint Lazare
Manitoba communities with majority francophone populations
Populated places disestablished in 2015
2015 disestablishments in Manitoba